This is a list of Brazilian television related events from 1977.

Events

Debuts

1970s
7 March - Sítio do Picapau Amarelo (1977–1986)

Television shows

1970s
Turma da Mônica (1976–present)

Ending this year
Vila Sésamo (1972-1977, 2007–present)

Births
21 September - Daniele Suzuki, actress & TV host
14 December - Ellen Jabour, model & TV host

Deaths

See also
1977 in Brazil